(), or simmered rice cake, is a popular Korean food made from small-sized  (long, white, cylinder-shaped rice cakes) called  ("rice cake noodles") or commonly  (" rice cakes"). Eomuk (fish cakes), boiled eggs, and scallions are some common ingredients paired with tteokbokki in dishes. It can be seasoned with either spicy gochujang (chili paste) or non-spicy ganjang (soy sauce)-based sauce; the former is the most common form, while the latter is less common and sometimes called gungjung-tteokbokki (royal court tteokbokki). 

Today, variations also include curry-tteokbokki, cream sauce-tteokbokki, jajang-tteokbokki, seafood-tteokbokki, rose-tteokbokki, galbi-tteokbokki and so on. Tteokbokki is commonly purchased and eaten at bunsikjip (snack bars) as well as pojangmacha (street stalls). There are also dedicated restaurants for tteokbokki, where it is referred to as jeukseok tteokbokki (impromptu tteokbokki). It is also a popular home dish, as the rice cakes (garae-tteok) can be purchased in pre-packaged, semi-dehydrated form.

History 
The first record on tteok-bokki appears in Siuijeonseo, a 19th-century cookbook, where the dish was listed using the archaic spelling steokbokgi. According to the book, tteok-bokki was known by various names including tteokjjim (steamed rice cakes), tteok-japchae (stir-fried rice cakes), and tteok-jeongol (rice cakes hot pot). The royal court version was made from white tteok (rice cakes), sirloin, sesame oil, soy sauce, scallions, rock tripe, pine nuts, and toasted and ground sesame seeds, while the savory, soy sauce-based tteok-bokki was made in the head house of the Papyeong Yun clan, where high-quality soy sauce was brewed. In this version, ingredients such as short ribs were common. The name tteok-bokki also appears in the revised and enlarged edition of Joseon Yori Jebeop, where it is described as a soy sauce-based savory dish.

It is believed that the spicy variant of tteok-bokki made with gochujang-based sauce first appeared in 1953. When Ma Bok-Lim participated in the opening of a Korean-Chinese restaurant, she accidentally dropped tteok, or rice cake, that was handed during the opening into jajangmyeon. Realizing that it tasted good, she developed the idea of seasoning tteok in the Korean chili sauce, gochujang. After that, she began selling it in Sindang, which now has since become the most common variant of tteok-bokki. Consequently, the district of Sindang is now famously known for tteok-boki. 

Today, the typical tteok-bokki purchased and eaten at bunsikjip (snack bars) and pojangmacha (street stalls) are red and spicy, while the soy sauce-based, non-spicy version is referred to as gungjung-tteok-bokki (궁중떡볶이; "royal court tteok-bokki"). Rice tteok rose in popularity as the South Korean economy developed, and various versions of the dish have proliferated since.  As it was once a working-class dish, wheat tteok was often substituted for rice tteok.

Varieties 
Like other popular Korean dishes, tteok-bokki has seen numerous variations and fusions. Boiled eggs and pan-fried mandu (dumplings) were traditionally added to tteok-bokki. Ingredients such as seafood, short ribs, instant noodles, chewy noodles are also common additions to the dish.

Variations based on added ingredients 
Haemul-tteok-bokki, (해물떡볶이; "seafood tteok-bokki") features seafood as its secondary ingredient.

Galbi-tteok-bokki (갈비떡볶이; "short rib tteok-bokki") features short ribs as its secondary ingredient.

Ra-bokki (라볶이; "instant noodle tteok-bokki") and jol-bokki (쫄볶이; "chewy noodle tteok-bokki") are similar variants which add noodles to tteok-bokki. Ra-bokki adds ramyeon (ramen) noodles, and jjol-bokki adds chewy jjolmyeon wheat noodles.

Jeukseok-tteok-bokki 
Jeongol (hot pot)-type tteok-bokki is called jeukseok-tteok-bokki ("on-the-spot tteok-bokki"), and is boiled on a table-top stove during the meal. A variety of additions, such as vegetables, mandu (dumplings), and ramyeon or udong noodles are available at jeukseok-tteok-bokki restaurants. As jeukseok-tteok-bokki is usually a meal rather than a snack, it is often paired with bokkeum-bap (fried rice).

Variation based on sauce

Gochujang tteok-bokki 

Piquant, red gochujang-based tteok-bokki is one of Korea's most popular snacks. While both soup-style gungmul-tteok-bokki ("soup tteok-bokki") and dry gireum-tteok-bokki ("oil tteok-bokki") are commonly enjoyed, the former is considered the de facto standard style. In gungmul-tteok-bokki, kelp-anchovy stock is often used to bring out the savory flavor. Gochugaru (chili powder) is often added for additional heat and color, while mullyeot (rice syrup) helps with sweetness and consistency. Eomuk (fish cakes), boiled eggs, and diagonally sliced scallions are common additions to the dish. In gireum-tteok-bokki, the mixture of gochugaru (고춧가루; "Korean chili powder"), soy sauce, sugar or syrup, and sesame oil often replaces gochujang (chili paste). Soft tteok sticks are seasoned with the sauce mixture, then stir-fried in cooking oil with a handful of chopped scallions and served. Tongin Market in Jongno, Seoul is famous for its gireum-tteok-bokki.

There are also many variations in gochujang tteok-bokki, such as a version that is seasoned with perilla leaf.

Ganjang tteok-bokki 

Sweet and savory, brown soy sauce-based tteok-bokki is often referred to as gungjung-tteok-bokki ("royal court tteok-bokki"). Its history dates back to a royal court dish before the introduction of chili pepper to the Korean peninsula in the mid-Joseon era (17th & 18th centuries). The earliest record of gungjung tteok-bokki is found in an 1800s cookbook called Siuijeonseo. Having a taste similar to japchae (stir-fried glass noodles and vegetables), it was enjoyed by the royals as a banchan and as a snack. Although traditional tteok-bokki was made with soup soy sauce, which is the traditional (and at the time, the only) type of soy sauce in pre-modern Korea, sweeter regular soy sauce has taken its place in modern times. Other traditional ingredients such as sirloin or short ribs, sesame oil, scallions, rock tripe, pine nuts, and toasted and ground sesame seeds are still commonly used in modern gungjung-tteok-bokki. Other ingredients such as mung bean sprouts, carrots, onions, dried Korean zucchini, garlic, and shiitake mushrooms are also common. The dish is typically served with egg garnish.

Other variations 
Gungmul (soup) tteok-bokki that are not based on either soy sauce or gochujang have also gained in popularity. There are some well-known variations.

Curry tteok-bokki uses a yellow Korean-style curry base.

Cream sauce tteok-bokki uses a base inspired by carbonara. Cream sauce and bacon are used instead of gochujang and fish cakes.

Rose tteok-bokki  named after rose pasta, as a variation. For this tteok-bokki, cream sauce is added to the basic tteok-bokki.

Jajang-tteok-bokki features a sauce based on jajang (sweet bean paste).

Cheese tteok-bokki is a variant in which the tteok-bokki is either topped or stuffed with cheese. It is sold in snack bars and can also easily be made at home. Depending on personal preference, it can be eaten with seasonings such as green tea powder, herb powder, sesame, or parsley.

Shanghainese 炒年糕, chǎo nián gāo is a stir-fried dish made with rice cake sliced into flat oval shapes, scallions, beef, pork, and cabbage.

Gireum and gyeran tteok-bokki 
Gireum tteok-bokki ("oil tteok-bokki") is a variety of tteok-bokki that is stir-fried in oil and served with little or no sauce.

Gyeran tteok-bokki (계란떡볶이; "egg tteok-bokki") is another variation that features no sauce. Only tteok (rice cakes), eggs, vegetables, and seasonings (primarily salt) are used. It differs from gireum tteok-bokki in that it is not spicy.

Gallery

See also 

 Bunsik
 Gimbap 
 Korean cuisine
 Korean royal court cuisine
 Rice cake
 Sundae
 Deep frying
 Nian gao

References

External links 

 Official website of Dongdaemoon Yeopgi Tteokbokki
Official website of Sinjeon Tteokbokki
Official website of BaeDDuck

Bunsik
Fried foods
Korean cuisine
Street food in South Korea
Tteok